Merrill Community Schools is a school district headquartered in Merrill, Michigan. It is a part of the Saginaw Intermediate School District and serves the Merrill area, including the village of Merrill, Jonesfield and Lakefield townships, most of Marion Township. Its schools include Merrill Elementary School and Merrill Middle/High School.

References

External links

 Merrill Community Schools

School districts in Michigan
Saginaw Intermediate School District